King Range may refer to:
 King Range (Antarctica), a mountain range in Victoria Land, Antarctica
 King Range (California), a mountain range in Humboldt County, California, part of the California Coast Ranges